Star Bank or Starbank or variation may refer to:

 Starbank Park, Newhaven, Edinburgh, Scotland, UK; a park
 Starbank School, Birmingham, West Midlands, England, UK; a non-selective community school
 Star Bank LPGA Classic, a former LPGA women's golf tournament
 STAR (interbank network)
 Star Banc Corporation, a former Cincinnati, Ohio, USA-based regional bank holding company

See also
 Bankable star
 Star (disambiguation)
 Bank (disambiguation)